Below is a complete list of the operas performed by Wexford Festival Opera since its inception in . Only complete operas presented on stage with orchestra are listed;  over the years, the Festival has also presented programmes of scenes from operas and one-act operas with piano accompaniment.

Nearly all the performances listed took place at the Theatre Royal, Wexford or (from 2008) at the new Wexford Opera House.  After the demolition of the Theatre Royal and during the building of the Opera House, the 2006 season operas were performed at the Dún Mhuire Theatre in Wexford, and the 2007 operas at Johnstown Castle, a few kilometres outside the town.

The Festival has been led by the following Artistic Directors:
1951–66: Tom Walsh
1967–73: Brian Dickie
1974–78: Thomson Smillie
1979–81: Adrian Slack
1982–94: Elaine Padmore
1995–2004: Luigi Ferrari
2005–2019: David Agler
2020–present: Rosetta Cucchi

List

Sources
Creative teams and singers for seasons 1951–2007:  
Creative teams and singers for the 2008–2012 seasons:  the programme books for those years.
Chronological list of operas:  the 2012 Wexford Festival Opera programme book.
"Operas Performed at the Wexford Festival, 1951-1972". Opera, Autumn 1973, Festival Issue, pp. 18–21.
The Programme Books for 2019, 2020, 2021 and 2022

Notes

Wexford Festival Opera
Opera-related lists
Opera festivals